TrSS St David was a passenger vessel built for the Great Western Railway in 1906.

History

From 1914 to 1919 she was requisitioned by the British Government as a hospital ship for the duration of the First World War.

She was re-engined in 1925.

On 20 August 1927 she was in collision with her sister ship TrSS St Patrick in Fishguard harbour.

In 1932 she was renamed Rosslare, to allow for a successor vessel to be named St Patrick. She was scrapped in September 1933.

References

1906 ships
Passenger ships of the United Kingdom
Steamships of the United Kingdom
Ships built on the River Clyde
Ships of the Great Western Railway